Terrebonne is a federal electoral district in the Canadian province of Quebec. It was represented in the House of Commons of Canada from 1867 to 1997, when it was dissolved in an electoral redistribution.  It was reconstituted as an electoral district again beginning with the 2015 election.

History
The riding was originally created by the British North America Act of 1867 which preserved existing electoral districts in Lower Canada. It was abolished in 1996 into Repentigny and Terrebonne—Blainville.

It was recreated during the 2012 federal electoral redistribution from parts of Terrebonne—Blainville (51%) and Montcalm (49%), and consists solely of the city of Terrebonne.

Demographics
According to the Canada 2016 Census

 Languages: (2016) 89.6% French, 2.2% English, 1.9% Creole, 1.7% Spanish, 1.3% Italian, 1.1% Arabic, 0.4% Portuguese, 0.3% Romanian

Members of Parliament

Election results

Terrebonne, 2015–present

Terrebonne, 1867–1997

	

Note: popular vote is compared to vote in 1882 general election.

Note: popular vote is compared to vote in 1878 general election.

References

Riding history 1867-1996 from the Library of Parliament

Quebec federal electoral districts
Terrebonne, Quebec